Sir William Michael John Grylls (21 February 1934 – 7 February 2001) was a British Conservative politician. He was implicated in the cash-for-questions affair, a political scandal of the 1990s. He was the father of adventurer and the Scout Association’s Chief Scout Bear Grylls.

Education and early career
Grylls was born in Folkestone, Kent, the son of Brigadier William Edward Harvey Grylls , of the 15th/19th The King's Royal Hussars, and Rachel Elizabeth, daughter of Brigadier General Kempster Kenmure Knapp and a cousin of the journalist and Conservative politician Bill Deedes. The Grylls family owned and lived at Winterbourne Zelston House, Blandford, Dorset; the family can be traced back to 17th century Cornwall. He was educated at the Royal Naval College, Dartmouth. His eyesight was not good enough for the Navy, so he joined the Royal Marines, and saw active service, leaving in 1955, and studying Spanish at the University of Madrid.

He turned his hand to business, setting up a wine importing firm called the 'Costa Brava Company'. His description of some of his products as "Spanish champagne" provoked the ire of both the makers of genuine champagne and its London importers; he was unsuccessfully prosecuted for trading under a false description, but they won a civil action against him for "passing off", i.e. misrepresenting his goods by using someone else's trademark.

From 1959 he served as a councillor on St. Pancras Borough Council, and was elected to the Greater London Council for the Cities of London and Westminster from 1967 to 1970.

Family
Grylls married Sarah (Sally) Smiles Justice Ford, the daughter of Patricia Ford, Lady Fisher, briefly an Ulster Unionist MP, and cricketer Neville Montagu Ford. Sally is the stepdaughter of Conservative MP Nigel Fisher and the stepsister of Labour MP Mark Fisher. The Gryllses have one daughter, Lara Sarah Grylls, and one son, Edward Michael "Bear" Grylls, the adventurer, TV presenter and the Scout Association’s Chief Scout, who is most recognised as the host of Born Survivor.

Career as Member of Parliament
Grylls was an unsuccessful candidate in the Fulham constituency in both the 1964 and 1966 general elections.  At the 1970 general election, he was returned to the House of Commons as Member of Parliament for Chertsey in Surrey.  His seat was abolished in boundary changes, but he was returned to Parliament for the new North West Surrey constituency in the February 1974 general election. He represented this constituency until his retirement at the 1997 election.

Andrew Roth, author of Parliamentary Profiles, in assessing Grylls's ideology, accused him of "opportunistic deviations", for example favouring little state interference with business, but supporting public funds for British Aerospace, which was a large employer in his constituency.

He was knighted in the 1992 New Years Honours List.

Cash for questions

For some years Grylls had acted as a consultant to the lobbying company run by Ian Greer at the heart of the Cash-for-Questions inquiry. The Parliamentary Commissioner for Standards, Sir Gordon Downey, stated that Grylls had "seriously misled" the select committee on members' interests in 1990 (replaced in 1995 by the Standards and Privileges Committee) by understating the number of payments he had received for introducing clients to ministers and Grylls' conduct, said Sir Gordon, had fallen "below the standards the House is entitled to expect of its members".

The Committee concluded that Grylls had "received payments from Mr Greer (though not in cash) which were neither introduction commissions nor fees associated with the Unitary Tax Campaign. It is not possible to conclude that these payments originated from Mohamed Al-Fayed, although Sir Michael actively participated in the Greer lobbying operation. Sir Michael deliberately misled the Select Committee on Members' Interests in 1990 by seriously understating the number of commission payments he had received; and by omitting to inform them of other fees received from Mr Greer. Sir Michael persistently failed to declare his interests in dealings with Ministers and officials over the House of Fraser. Sir Michael's action in taking a commission payment for introducing a constituent to Mr Greer was unacceptable. There is insufficient evidence to show that Sir Michael solicited business for Mr Greer in expectation of commission payments."

Other
Grylls was a member of the Royal Yacht Squadron until his death in 2001; his widow remains an honorary member. In Piers Morgan's Life Stories, Bear Grylls said that his father had a pace-maker fitted in February 2001, but suddenly died of a heart attack two days after his operation while recovering at home.

References

Sources 
 Times Guide to the House of Commons, Times Newspapers Limited, 1992 edition.

External links 
 

1934 births
2001 deaths
Graduates of Britannia Royal Naval College
University of Paris alumni
Royal Marines officers
Conservative Party (UK) MPs for English constituencies
Members of St Pancras Metropolitan Borough Council
Members of the Greater London Council
UK MPs 1970–1974
UK MPs 1974
UK MPs 1974–1979
UK MPs 1979–1983
UK MPs 1983–1987
UK MPs 1987–1992
UK MPs 1992–1997
Knights Bachelor
Politicians awarded knighthoods
British Eurosceptics